This is a list of buildings that are examples of the Art Deco architectural style in Minnesota, United States.

Ely 
 Ely City Hall and Fire Department, Ely, 1920s
 Ely Community Center, Ely, 1938
 Ely State Theater, Ely, 1936

Faribault 
 Faribault Viaduct, Faribault, 1937
 Faribault Water Works, Faribault, 1933–1938
 Rice County Courthouse and Jail, Faribault, 1910 and 1934
 Thomas Scott Buckham Memorial Library, Faribault, 1930

International Falls 
 Alexander Baker School, International Falls, 1914
 E.W. Backus Junior High School, International Falls, 1936
 Pete Peterson Band Shell, International Falls, 1930s

Minneapolis 
 Aaron and Naomi Friedell House, Minneapolis, 1940
 Avalon Theater, Minneapolis, 1924 and 1937
 Boulevard Theatre, Minneapolis, 1933
 Brede Exhibits-Plus, Minneapolis, 1940s
 CenturyLink Building (former Qwest Building), Minneapolis, 1932
 Christ Church Lutheran, Minneapolis, 1948
 Cream of Wheat Building, Minneapolis, 1928
 Dwight C DeMaine, D.D.S. offices, Minneapolis, 1938
 Farmers and Mechanics Savings Bank, Minneapolis, 1942
 First Avenue, Minneapolis, 1937
 Forum Cafeteria, Minneapolis, 1914, 1930
 Foshay Tower, Minneapolis, 1929
 General Mills Laboratories, Minneapolis, 1930
 Hollywood Theater, Minneapolis, 1935
 Midtown Exchange, Minneapolis, 1927
 Minneapolis Armory, Minneapolis, 1936
 Minneapolis Post Office, Minneapolis, 1933
 Minnesota Veterans Home, Minneapolis, 1911
 Modern Times Cafe (former Modern Dry Cleaner), Minneapolis
 Murray's, Minneapolis, 1946
 Oak Street Cinema, Minneapolis, 1935
 Orpheum Theatre, Minneapolis, 1921
 Parkway Theatre, Minneapolis, 1931
 Rand Tower, Minneapolis, 1929
 Riverview Theater, Minneapolis, 1948
 Midtown Exchange, Minneapolis, 1927
 Second Church of Christ Scientist, Minneapolis, 1930
 Uptown Theater, Minneapolis, 1939
 V. M. S. Kaufmann House, Minneapolis, 1936
 Washburn Park Water Tower, Minneapolis, 1931
 Wells Fargo Center, Minneapolis, 1988
 Varsity Theater, Dinkytown, Minneapolis, 1915, 1939
 Zinsmaster Apartments (former Zinsmaster Baking Company), Minneapolis

Saint Paul 
 Como Park Zoo and Conservatory Zoological Building, Saint Paul, 1936
 First National Bank Building, Saint Paul, 1915
 Grandview Theater, Saint Paul, 1933
 Krank Manufacturing Company building, Saint Paul, 1926
 Mickey's Diner, Saint Paul, 1937
 Minnesota Building, Saint Paul, 1929
 Minnesota Milk Company Building, Saint Paul
 Robert Street Bridge, Sant Paul, 1926
 Roy Wilkins Auditorium, Saint Paul, 1932
 Saint Paul City Hall and Ramsey County Courthouse, Saint Paul, 1932
 Saint Paul Women's City Club, Saint Paul, 1931
 United States Post Office and Customs House, Saint Paul, 1934

Other cities 
 Alworth Building, Duluth, 1910
 Bigfork Village Hall, Bigfork, 1937
 Blue Earth Post Building, Blue Earth, 1930s
 Brandon Auditorium, City Hall, and Fire Department, Brandon, 1936
 Cozy Theatre, Wadena, 1929
 David Park House, Bemidji, 1936
 Edina Theatre, 3911 West 50th Street, Edina, 1934 and 1981
 Grey Eagle Village Hall, Grey Eagle, 1934
 Hibbing Disposal Plant, Hibbing, 1939
 Hibbing Memorial Building, Hibbing, 1935
 Jefferson Elementary School, Winona, 1938
 KFAM Radio Station, St. Cloud
 Milaca Municipal Hall, Milaca, 1936
 Minnesota Music Hall of Fame, New Ulm
 Minnesota State Fair 4-H Building, Falcon Heights, 1940
 Minnesota State Fair Horticulture Building, Falcon Heights, 1947
 Municipal Building – City Hall and Fire Department, Alden, 1938
 Naniboujou Club Lodge, East Cook, 1928
 NorShor Theatre, Duluth, 1940s
 Pastime Arena (now Roller Garden), St. Louis Park, 1930
 Plummer Building, Rochester, 1927
 Red River History Museum (former school), Shelly
 Rialto Theatre, Aitkin, 1937
 Roosevelt Hall, Barrett, 1934
 United States Post Office, Marshall, 1938
 Washington–Kosciusko School, Winona, 1934
 Waverly Village Hall, Waverly, 1939
 Willmar City Auditorium, Willmar, 1938
 Willmar Municipal Airport, Willmar, 1934
 Winona City Hall, Winona, 1939
 Worthington Band Shell, Worthington, 1941

See also 
 List of Art Deco architecture
 List of Art Deco architecture in the United States

References 

 "Art Deco & Streamline Moderne Buildings." Roadside Architecture.com. Retrieved 2019-01-03.
 Cinema Treasures. Retrieved 2022-09-06
 "Court House Lover". Flickr. Retrieved 2022-09-06
 "New Deal Map". The Living New Deal. Retrieved 2020-12-25.
 "SAH Archipedia". Society of Architectural Historians. Retrieved 2021-11-21.

External links 
 

 
Art Deco
Art Deco architecture in the United States
Minnesota-related lists